James W. "Skip" Hazzard was an American football coach.  He served the head football coach at Arkansas Agricultural, Mechanical & Normal College (Arkansas AM&N)—now known as University of Arkansas at Pine Bluff—for three seasons, from 1932 to 1934, compiling a record of 14–10–4.

Head coaching record

Football

References

Year of birth missing
Year of death missing
Arkansas–Pine Bluff Golden Lions football coaches